Statistics of Libyan Premier League for the 1997–98 season.

Overview
It was contested by 16 teams, and Al Tahaddy Benghazi won the championship.

League standings

References
Libya - List of final tables (RSSSF)

Libyan Premier League seasons
1
Libya